James Cornelius Knatchbull-Hugessen  (born July 26, 1933), known professionally as James K. Hugessen, is a judge currently serving on the Federal Court of Canada.  He is the son of the senator Adrian Knatchbull-Hugessen.

Born in Montreal in 1933, James K. Hugessen was educated at Oxford University and McGill University. After graduating with a B.C.L. from McGill in 1957, he was called to the bar in 1958 and entered private practice. 

From 1962 to 1974, he was an adjunct professor in McGill's Faculty of Law. In 1972, he was appointed as a justice of the Quebec Superior Court. In 1983 he became a judge of the Federal Court of Canada, Appeal Division and retired in 2008. After his retirement, he was appointed as a deputy judge of the Federal Court. 

His other appointments have included the Administrative Tribunal of the International Labour Organization and the Supreme Court of the North-West Territories. A visually-disabled person, he served as the chair of the federal Task Force on Access to Information for Print-Disabled Canadians. 

In 2009, as a result of his outstanding judicial career and long term service to McGill's Faculty of Law, he was given the F.R. Scott Award for Distinguished Service. 

In 2014, he was named a Member of the Order of Canada. 

His archive is held at the McGill University Archives.

References

1933 births
Living people
Anglophone Quebec people
Canadian Anglicans
Judges of the Federal Court of Canada
McGill University Faculty of Law alumni
Members of the Order of Canada
People from Montreal
James